Deceptive Records was a British independent record label formed in 1993 by Steve Lamacq, Tony Smith and Alan James, which concentrated on rock and alternative rock.  The most famous group signed to the label were Elastica.

Steve Lamacq left the company after the release of Elastica's first album to avoid accusations of partiality on the Evening Session, his BBC Radio 1 show. Owing to financial struggles, the label closed down on 4 February 2001.

Bands and artists
 Angelica
 Collapsed Lung
 Elastica
 The Junket
 Scarfo
 Snuff
 Earl Brutus
 Jonathan Fire*Eater
 Shriek
 Spare Snare
 Superfine
 Unun
 The Pin Ups
 Lauren Laverne
 Idlewild
 Placebo
 Ten Benson

See also
 List of record labels

References

External links 
 Profile of Label on Discogs

British record labels
Record labels established in 1993
Record labels disestablished in 2001
Rock record labels
Alternative rock record labels